Lawrence Hart may refer to:

Lawrence Hart (American football), see 1998 NFL Draft
Lawrence Hart (Tennessee politician), see Metropolitan Council (Nashville)
Lawrence Hart (poet) (1901-1996), American poet of the "Activist Group"
Lawrence Hart (athlete)

See also
Larry Hart (disambiguation)